The 2019 Armenian Cup Final was the 28th Armenian Cup Final, and the final match of the 2018–19 Armenian Cup. It was played at the Banants Stadium in Yerevan, Armenia, on 8 May 2019, and was contested by Alashkert and Lori. 
It was Alashkert's second Cup final appearance, having lost on penalties to Gandzasar Kapan the previous year, whilst it was Lori's first appearance in the final. Alashkert defeated Noah 1–0 thanks to an own goal by Ubong Friday in the 65th minute.

Match
The match was refereed by Spanish referee Alberto Undiano Mallenco, and his two assistants Iñigo Prieto López and Roberto Alonso Fernandez.

Details

References

Armenian Cup Finals
Cup Final